Lixophaga aberrans is a species of tachinid fly in the genus Lixophaga of the family Tachinidae.

External links

Exoristinae
Insects described in 1929